"Turn it Out" is a 1995 single by Labelle, their first new music as a band in nearly twenty years. The single was written by Shep Pettibone and Steve Feldman, and was recorded for the 1995 movie To Wong Foo, Thanks for Everything! Julie Newmar. "Turn it Out" was produced by Pettibone and went to number one on the US dance charts, where it stayed for one week.

Track list
 1. "Turn It Out (The Bomb Mix)"  remix, producer [additional] – Frankie Knuckles 9:46
 2. "Turn It Out (Miss Thing's Runway Dub") remix, producer [additional] – Frankie Knuckles 6:03
 3. "Turn It Out (Shep's Totally Turnt Out Twelve Inch Anthem Mix)" 10:26
 4. "Turn It Out (Shep's Totally Turnt dub)" 8:30

See also
 List of number-one dance singles of 1995 (U.S.)

References

1995 singles
Labelle songs
Songs written by Shep Pettibone
Songs written for films
1995 songs
Electronic songs
House music songs